is a Japanese photographer.

References
Nihon shashinka jiten / 328 Outstanding Japanese Photographers. Kyoto: Tankōsha, 2000. . 

Japanese photographers
20th-century Japanese photographers
1947 births
Living people
Place of birth missing (living people)
Date of birth missing (living people)